If We Make It Through December is the sixteenth studio album by American country singer Merle Haggard and The Strangers, released in 1974. It reached number 4 on the Billboard country album charts. The title track was previously released on Haggard's Christmas release of 1973, A Christmas Present. The single spent four weeks at No. 1 on the Billboard magazine Hot Country Singles chart in December 1973 and January 1974, and cracked the Top 30 of the Billboard Hot 100. "If We Make It Through December" was the No. 2 song of the year on Billboard's Hot Country Singles 1974 year-end chart.

History
Haggard's 1973 Christmas single "If We Make It Through December" proved to be so popular that it became the title track for this February 1974 release. The song explores the feelings of an unemployed father struggling to make ends meet and provide a happy Christmas for his daughter. As Daniel Cooper observes in the liner notes to the 1994 Haggard box set Down Every Road, "That it's one of the most heartbreaking Christmas songs ever recorded didn't matter to people who prefer honestly rendered pain to false merriment." In his book Merle Haggard: The Running Kind, David Cantwell notes that "If We Make It Through December" is a Christmas song, but "it feels like an anti-Christmas song. The character he plays isn't just feeling blue this holiday season like we've seen in hundreds of other Christmas numbers. He hates Christmas, hates the whole idea of it, at least this year." The song reached number one on the country singles chart and crossed over to number 28 on the pop charts, becoming Haggard's biggest hit.

Although Haggard had been writing the majority of the songs on his LPs for years, outside contributions dominate this album. As he later recalled in his 1981 autobiography Sing Me Back Home, Haggard and wife Bonnie Owens were splitting up at the time.

Reception

Stephen Thomas Erlewine of AllMusic writes, "Usually, Merle Haggard's musical eclecticism is a virtue, but on If We Make It Through December it hurts the overall impact of the album. Many of the individual tracks—particularly the gentle, yearning title track and good versions of Lefty Frizzell's 'I'm An Old, Old Man (Tryin' To Live While I Can)' and the country standard 'To Each His Own'- work well on their own, but often the straight-up country, western swing, Dixieland experiments and pop-tinged ballads seem at odds with each other." Music critic Robert Christgau wrote "Last time it was good to hear him go contemporary again. This time one of the two contemporary standouts sounds mysteriously like Bob Wills. The Lefty Frizzell and Floyd Tillman remakes come across fresh and clean. The Ink Spots remake doesn't."

Track listing
"If We Make It Through December" (Merle Haggard) – 2:42
"Love and Honor Never Crossed Your Mind" (Haggard) – 2:48
"To Each His Own" (Jay Livingston, Ray Evans) – 2:35
"You're the Only Girl in the Game" (Hank Cochran, Glenn Martin) – 2:55
"I'm an Old Old Man (Tryin' to Live While I Can)" (Lefty Frizzell) – 2:34
"Come on into My Arms" (Marcia Nichols) – 2:48
"Better Off When I Was Hungry" (Dave Kirby) – 2:24
"I'll Break Out Again Tonight" (Arthur Leo Owens, Sanger D. Shafer) – 2:50
"This Cold War With You" (Floyd Tillman) – 2:54
"Uncle Lem" (Glenn Martin) – 2:54
"There's Just One Way" (Haggard, Kenny Seratt) – 2:49

Personnel
Merle Haggard– vocals, guitar

The Strangers:
Roy Nichols – lead guitar
Norman Hamlet – steel guitar, Dobro
 Bobby Wayne – guitar
 Marcia Nichols – guitar
Dennis Hromek – bass, background vocals
Biff Adam – drums

with
Tommy Collins– guitar
Dave Kirby – guitar
Ronnie Reno – guitar
Mark Yeary – piano
Johnny Meeks – bass
Johnny Gimble – fiddle

and
Hargus "Pig" Robbins – piano, organ
Billy Liebert – piano
Joe Zinkan – bass
Bill Woods – fiddle
Bill Puett – horns

Charts

Weekly charts

Year-end charts

References

1974 albums
Merle Haggard albums
Capitol Records albums
Albums produced by Ken Nelson (United States record producer)